William Bruce Kellogg (April 13, 1910 – May 22, 1967) was an American actor. He was best known for playing the title role in The Deerslayer.

In the 1940s he was under contract to MGM.

Select Credits

References

External links

 

1910 births
1967 deaths
20th-century American male actors